Khrist Raja High School is a private Catholic primary and secondary school located in Bettiah, in the state of Bihar, India. Founded by the Jesuits in 1927, the school became coeducational in 1998.

History
Khrist Raja High School (K.R.), Bettiah, was founded by the Society of Jesus in 1927 and in 1930 moved to its present campus. Khrist Raja High School has been considered the "premier school of north Bihar", with students attending from all over the state and staying at its residential facilities.

The Khrist Raja High School has served the Bettiah Christians, the northern Indian subcontinent's oldest Christian community, with statistics showing that 83.6% of Christian pupils from 1927 to 1928 were from the Bettiah Christian community (including the Bettiah Christian diaspora).

Notable alumni

 Manoj Bajpayee - Indian Film Actor
 Cajetan Francis Osta - bishop of Muzaffarpur

See also

 List of Jesuit schools

References  

Jesuit secondary schools in India
Jesuit primary schools in India
High schools and secondary schools in Bihar
West Champaran district
Educational institutions established in 1927
1927 establishments in India
Christian schools in Bihar